The Al  madani  family descends from the Shikh Hasan Al Madani section of the Al Qureash, a highly respected and authoritative tribal federation that was the dominant power throughout most of what is now.

The Al Madani  family's reign as rulers of Lavar Shikh began in 1087 when Sheikh Mohamad bin Sheikh Rashed bin Sheikh Mostafa Al Madani and around 1088 tribesmen moved from Medina.

See also 
Kookherd
Bastak
Bandar Lengeh
Morbagh
Maghoh
Medina
Hormozgān

References
 اطلس گیتاشناسی استان‌های ایران [Atlas Gitashenasi Ostanhai Iran] (Gitashenasi Province Atlas of Iran)

Bastak County
Iranian-language surnames